Erdőkürt is a village in Nógrád County, Hungary with 609 inhabitants (2001).

References

Populated places in Nógrád County